New Lots Avenue may refer to the following stations of the New York City Subway in Brooklyn:

New Lots Avenue (BMT Canarsie Line) at Van Sinderen Avenue; serving the  train
New Lots Avenue (IRT New Lots Line) at Livonia Avenue; serving the  trains